Cribrarula cribraria, the 'sieve/tan and white cowry', is a species of sea snail, a cowry, a marine gastropod mollusk in the family Cypraeidae, the cowries.

Description
 The mantle of this cowry is translucent bright orange-red. Cribrarula cribraria is one of the most recognizable cowries. The shells reach  of length. These shells are smooth, their basic coloration is pale brown or fawn, with several circular white spots. The edges of the shell are white, as is the flat base.

Distribution
This species and its subspecies are distributed in the Red Sea and in the Indian Ocean along Aldabra, Chagos, the Comores, Kenya, Madagascar,  Mozambique, the Seychelles and Tanzania.

Habitat
They mostly feed at night on encrusting sponges.

Subspecies
The following subspecies are recognized :
Cribrarula cribraria australiensis Lorenz, 2002
Cribrarula cribraria comma (Perry, 1811)
Cribrarula cribraria cribraria (Linnaeus, 1758)

References

 Bozzetti, L., 2007. Cribrarula toliaraensis (Gastropoda: Cypraeidae) nuova specie dal Madagascar sud-occidentale. Malacologia Mostra Mondiale 56: 3-4

External links
 Underwater
 Biolib
 

Cypraeidae
Gastropods described in 1758
Taxa named by Carl Linnaeus